Parliamentary elections were held in South Yemen between 28 and 30 October 1986, having originally been scheduled for 1983, but later postponed. A total of 181 candidates contested the 111 seats. Although the country was a one-party state at the time, with the Yemeni Socialist Party as the sole legal party, independents were also able to run as candidates.

The result was a victory for the Socialist Party, which won 71 seats. Voter turnout was reported to be 88.78%.

Electoral system
The 111 Members of Parliament were elected by plurality in eighty constituencies, with voters having the same number of votes as the number of seats available in their constituency.

Results

References

1986 in South Yemen
South Yemen
Elections in Yemen
One-party elections
Election and referendum articles with incomplete results
October 1986 events in Asia